On 6 September 2022, the An Phu karaoke bar in Thuận An, Bình Dương Province, Vietnam, caught fire and killed at least 33 people. Some survivors jumped from second and third storey windows. It is one of the deadliest fires in modern Vietnamese history.

References

2022 disasters in Vietnam
2022 fires in Asia
Fires in Vietnam
2022 karaoke bar fire
September 2022 events in Vietnam